John Edward Barrett,  (born 17 April 1931) is a former tennis player, television commentator and author. He was born in Mill Hill, North West London, the son of Alfred Edward Barrett, a leaf tobacco merchant, and Margaret Helen Barrett (née Walker). He had one sister, Irene Margaret Leppington (1925–2009), a research chemist. His father had the rare distinction of having played both for Leicester Tigers RFC as a wing three-quarter and for Leicester Fosse FC (the former Leicester City) as a wing half.

Biography
Educated at University College School in Hampstead, he was a prominent British junior tennis player and won the National Schoolboy title in 1948. He also played three years of junior country rugby for Middlesex, captaining an unbeaten team in his last year.  He was twice the Royal Air Force tennis champion during his period of National Service which he completed before going up to St. John's College, Cambridge (1951–1954), where he gained an honours degree in History. He represented Cambridge in three winning years against Oxford, captaining the team in his last year, and twice represented Oxford and Cambridge in the biennial match against Harvard and Yale for the Prentice Cup, winning in 1952 and losing in 1954.

He went on to compete at Wimbledon for eighteen years from 1951, reaching the third round of the singles on four occasions and the quarter-finals of the mixed doubles three times. At his peak he was ranked as his country's fifth best singles player. His five career singles tiles wins from ten finals were at the North of England Hard Court Championships at Scarborough on clay in April 1953, the same month he won the Roehampton Hardcourt tournament at Roehampton also on clay. In September 1953 he won the Welsh Covered Court Championships at Llandudno on indoor wood courts. In April 1956 he won the Hurlingham Hardcourt tournament on clay. His last title was at the Northern Championships in Manchester on grass in May 1966.

His doubles successes included the capture of the 1953 National Covered Court title with Don Black of Rhodesia and the 1956 Asian Doubles with Roger Becker. In 1956 he became a Davis Cup player and was appointed captain of the British Davis Cup team for the years 1959–1962. Three years later he established and ran the LTA Training Squad, known as "The Barrett Boys" which set new standards of fitness in British tennis between 1965 and 1968.

In 1955 he had joined Slazengers Ltd., the sports equipment firm, as a trainee executive and remained with them for 39 years rising to become the International Promotions Director for tennis and a member of the board of directors until his retirement in 1994. During his time with the company he became the tennis correspondent of the Financial Times in 1963, a post he filled as a freelance contributor until 2006. In 1986 he joined the team that compiles the daily crossword for the pink paper and still compiles a themed crossword for each year's Wimbledon.

To mark the start of open tennis in 1968 he launched the BP International Tennis Fellowship in association with the oil company. This was a junior development programme open to all young boys and girls who had won an age-group singles title at any junior tournament on the LTA's official list of events. The following year he published "The BP Yearbook of World Tennis" to record the events of that momentous first year of open competition. In 1971 the title was changed to World of Tennis and he edited and contributed to it for the next 32 years. From 1981 to 2001, when the last issue was published, this bible of the game was also the official yearbook of the International Tennis Federation (ITF).

His other writing includes Tennis and Racket Games (Macdonald 1975), Play Tennis With Rosewall, a coaching manual produced in collaboration with the great Australian champion, and he co-authored From Where I Sit, the autobiography of Dan Maskell, his predecessor as Wimbledon's Voice of Tennis for BBC Television. His monument to the game "100 Wimbledons – a Celebration" was first published in 1986 and re-published in 2001 as "Wimbledon – the Official History of The Championships". A third revised and expanded edition, "Wimbledon the Official History", brought the story up to date when it was published in May 2013. In June 2014 an updated fourth edition appeared to include the historic events of 2013 when Andy Murray became the first British men's champion for 77 years.

Barrett's broadcasting career with BBC Television began in 1971.  Barrett began commentating on Wimbledon men's singles finals for BBC Television at the end of the 1970s.  Barrett's voice was heard on the BBC broadcast of the epic fourth set tiebreak between Borg and McEnroe in the 1980 final (this has often been shown again on TV).  Barrett commentated on Wimbledon men's singles finals until 1998. David Mercer took over from Barrett for the 1999 and 2000 men's singles finals, but Barrett commentated on the 2001 and 2002 finals. From 2003, Andrew Castle commentated on Wimbledon men's singles finals instead of Barrett.  Barrett announced his retirement from the BBC commentary box at Wimbledon in 2006. Barrett also commentated for Channel 9, Australia (1980–1986) and for Channel Seven, Australia (1987–2007) and at various times for BSB and Sky in the UK; HBO, ESPN and the USA Networks in America; CTV in Canada and ATV and TVB in Hong Kong. In 2007 he was awarded the MBE for Services to Sports Broadcasting. For fourteen years (1997–2011) he served as President of The Dan Maskell Trust, a charitable organisation established in 1997 to help people with disabilities to play tennis.

A member of the International Lawn Tennis Club of Great Britain since 1953, he served as chairman from 1983 to 1994, as President from 2004 to 2008 and is currently a Vice-President.

A member of the All England Lawn Tennis and Croquet Club since 1955 and currently a Vice-President, he served for twelve years on the Club Committee and the Committee of Management of The Championships, during which time he started to compile a complete database of every result that has ever occurred at Wimbledon, in all events. This mammoth task took some 20 years to complete and can now be accessed on the Club's web site.

In April 1967 he married the former French, Australian and Wimbledon champion Angela Mortimer and they have a son, a daughter and four grandchildren. In 2014 Barrett was inducted into the International Tennis Hall of Fame.

Awards and honours
 2004 Lawn Tennis Writers Association of Great Britain Annual Award
 2006 ATP Tour Ron Bookman Media Excellence Award
 2007 Member of the Order of the British Empire (MBE) for  his services to broadcasting.
 2010 British Sports Book Awards (Best Illustrated Book), Centre Court: The Jewel in Wimbledon's Crown (with Ian Hewitt)
 2014 International Tennis Hall of Fame

Selected bibliography
 World of Tennis (1969–2001)
 Tennis and Racket Games (1975), 
 Play Tennis With Rosewall (with Ken Rosewall) (1975) 
 100 Wimbledon Championships: A Celebration (1986) 
 From Where I Sit (with Dan Maskell) (1988) 
 Oh! I Say (with Dan Maskell) (1989), 
 100 Wimbledons – a celebration (1986), 
 Wimbledon – the Official History of the Championships (2001), 
 Wimbledon – the Official History (2013) 
 Wimbledon – the Official History (2014)

References

External links
 

1931 births
Living people
Alumni of St John's College, Cambridge
Members of the Order of the British Empire
English male tennis players
English sports broadcasters
Tennis commentators
Tennis writers
BBC sports presenters and reporters
International Tennis Hall of Fame inductees
English male non-fiction writers
Tennis people from Greater London
British male tennis players
People from Mill Hill